The men's 400 metres hurdles event at the 1932 Olympic Games took place on July 31 and August 1 at the Los Angeles Memorial Coliseum. There were 18 competitors from 13 nations. The 1930 Olympic Congress in Berlin had reduced the limit from 4 athletes per NOC to 3 athletes. The event was won by Bob Tisdall of Ireland, the nation's first medal in the event in its 400 metres hurdles debut. The United States took silver (Glenn Hardin) and bronze (Morgan Taylor), extending its streak of taking at least silver in all 7 appearances of the event to that point. Taylor became the first man to earn three medals in the event, adding to his 1924 gold and 1928 bronze. Defending champion David Burghley of Great Britain finished fourth.

Background

This was the seventh time the event was held. It had been introduced along with the men's 200 metres hurdles in 1900, with the 200 being dropped after 1904 and the 400 being held through 1908 before being left off the 1912 programme. However, when the Olympics returned in 1920 after World War I, the men's 400 metres hurdles was back and would continue to be contested at every Games thereafter.

Four of the six finalists from the 1928 Games returned: gold medalist David Burghley of Great Britain, bronze medalist (and 1924 gold medalist) Morgan Taylor of the United States, fourth-place finisher Sten Pettersson of Sweden, and sixth-place finisher Luigi Facelli of Italy. The field was small but competitive; Burghley and Taylor were the favorites, but strong contenders also included Bob Tisdall of Ireland (a talented decathlete with little experience in the 400 metres hurdles) and Glenn Hardin of the United States (who had won the U.S. trials despite stepping out of his lane and being disqualified from the AAU title held jointly with the trials); Hardin would go on to win Olympic gold in 1936.

Brazil, Germany, Ireland, Japan, and Mexico each made their debut in the event. The United States made its seventh appearance, the only nation to have competed at every edition of the event to that point.

Competition format

The competition featured the three-round format introduced in 1908: quarterfinals, semifinals, and a final. Ten sets of hurdles were set on the course. The hurdles were 3 feet (91.5 centimetres) tall and were placed 35 metres apart beginning 45 metres from the starting line, resulting in a 40 metres home stretch after the last hurdle. The 400 metres track was standard.

There were 4 quarterfinal heats, with between 4 and 5 athletes each. The top 3 men in each quarterfinal advanced to the semifinals. The 12 semifinalists were divided into 2 semifinals of 6 athletes each, with the top 3 in each semifinal advancing to the 6-man final.

Records

These were the standing world and Olympic records (in seconds) prior to the 1932 Summer Olympics.

Glenn Hardin set a new Olympic record in the first semifinal at 52.8 seconds. Bob Tisdall matched that time in the second semifinal. In the final, Tisdall finished at 51.8 seconds but was ineligible for a world record under the rules of the time as he had knocked down the last hurdle. Hardin's second-place time of 52.0 matched the world record.

Schedule

Results

Quarterfinals

Four heats were held; the fastest three runners advanced to the semifinals round.

Quarterfinal 1

Quarterfinal 2

Quarterfinal 3

Quarterfinal 4

Semifinals

Two heats were held; the fastest three runners advanced to the final round.

Semifinal 1

Semifinal 2

Final

Tisdall's time was rejected as a world record as he knocked over the last hurdle, as per the rules of the time; Hardin was therefore credited as world record holder, equalling his own time of 52.0.

Results summary

References

Athletics at the 1932 Summer Olympics
400 metres hurdles at the Olympics
Men's events at the 1932 Summer Olympics